Harston Wood is a nature reserve of the Staffordshire Wildlife Trust. It is an ancient woodland, adjacent to the village of Froghall, near Cheadle, Staffordshire, England.

Description
The wood was established as a nature reserve in 1983, in agreement with the owner, Mrs G. Hayes.

It is nearly a mile long, on a steep valley side between Shirley Brook (a tributary of the River Churnet) to the north, and the route of a former tramway, now a footpath, from where the entire length of the reserve can be seen.

Existing for over 400 years, the wood is ancient woodland. It was once coppiced to supply timber for charcoal making. There are mostly ash trees; other species include hazel and oak; also small-leaved lime, which, seldom producing viable seeds in Britain, is only found in long-established woods. In waterlogged places there are areas of alder carr.

The wood is a habitat for woodpeckers, nuthatches and treecreepers. On the ground of the woodland there is wild garlic, yellow archangel and wood-sorrel. Twayblade and broadleaved helleborine can be seen next to the tramway.

References

External links
 "Churnet Valley Living Landscapes project Staffordshire Wildlife Trust

Nature reserves in Staffordshire
Forests and woodlands of Staffordshire
Ancient woods in England
Alder carrs